History of the Grateful Dead, Volume One (Bear's Choice) is a live album by the Grateful Dead. It is their fourth live album and their ninth album overall. Released in July 1973 on Warner Bros. Records, it offers concert highlights recorded February 13 and 14, 1970 at the Fillmore East in New York City. Often known simply as Bear's Choice, the title references band soundman Owsley "Bear" Stanley. It was originally intended to be the first volume of a series.

The album peaked at number 60 on the Billboard 200.

Recording
The album was recorded during a period when the Grateful Dead were playing concerts consisting of electric sets, plus an acoustic set, revisiting their roots as a folk/jug band. Reflecting this approach (though it was ultimately released three years later), the album has an acoustic side and an electric side. As per policy at
the time at promoter Bill Graham's Fillmore East, the band played both an early show and a late show. The recordings were culled from the February 13 & 14, 1970 late shows (bonus tracks on reissues include contemporaneous recordings from Graham's Fillmore West, in San Francisco). Dick's Picks Volume 4, an album released in 1996, offers additional material from these same performances.

The original album was recorded and produced by Owsley "Bear" Stanley, the Dead's then-soundman, who chose his favorite tracks. He compiled it as a tribute of sorts to Ron "Pigpen" McKernan, the band's original keyboard player and blues aficionado, who died during the production of the release. As such, it features three songs on which Pigpen sings lead, including all of side two.

Band manager Rock Scully said "Pigpen went out on the stage and sat down in a chair ... it was the only time he ever did it. He sat down and played the bottleneck guitar. We'd been pushing him for years to do it and finally he just got loose enough and comfortable enough with the audience there at the Fillmore to go out and do it. He went out and sat down on the stage—it was Valentine's Day and he had a honey out in the crowd. He went out and played 'Katie Mae' to her. Immediately following that, Bobby (Weir) and Garcia went out and did the same thing. They sat down and played acoustic guitars. They don't do that anymore."

Though it was something of a contractual obligation, as the band were trying to finish the terms of their recording contract and end their association with Warner Bros., it was compiled as the first volume of either a two-volume set or a series. However, further volumes never came to be as the band were creating their own record label, after which difficulties prevented the release of live archival recordings. Lead guitarist Jerry Garcia explained, "We [had to] give it to them in order to make Europe '72 a triple LP... We ended up giving them four discs instead of just two just to be able to go to Europe. It all goes back to that damn vacation of ours... [It represents] us in early 1970, at a time in our existence when we never made a record. The stuff we were doing at the time never got onto any of our records before now." Drummer Bill Kreutzmann commented, "To fulfill our contract with Warner Brothers, we let Bear put together a live anthology—hence the nickname Bear’s Choice. The official title, History of the Grateful Dead, Volume One, reflects its unofficial intent as a tribute and send-off to Pigpen."

Release
Side one consists of acoustic performances by McKernan, Jerry Garcia, and Bob Weir on country blues and folk covers, with one original from Workingman's Dead. The second side features the entire electric band on blues covers "Smokestack Lightning" by Howlin' Wolf, and "Hard to Handle" by Otis Redding.

The parenthetical "Bear's Choice" of the title prevented confusion with a homonymous, non-contractual album, in retail bins at the time. For this reason and due to title length, fans usually refer to the album simply  as "Bear's Choice".

A large complement of iconography is associated with the Grateful Dead. Along with the "Skull & Roses" and dancing terrapins, perhaps the most ubiquitous are the  "Lightning Skull/Steal", and the "Dancing Bears", which notably made their first appearance on the front and rear covers, respectively, of this album. Designed by Bob Thomas, the latter have been incorporated into an endless array of both fan-produced and official merchandise and ephemera. Though usually referred to as the "Dancing Bears" they are, in fact, marching and not dancing. The front cover also has the first appearance of the "Good Old Grateful Dead" epithet, circling the "Lightning Skull" graphic.

The album was remastered for compact disc, in 2001, as part of The Golden Road (1965–1973) box set. This version, with four bonus tracks, was given separate release in 2003. The contemporaneous bonus tracks include another one from the February 13, 1970 concert, and three from a week earlier at the Fillmore West in San Francisco. In keeping with the tributary nature of the original record, three of the four tracks feature lead vocals by McKernan.

Track listing

Notes
 Sides one and two were combined as tracks 1–7 on CD reissues.
 More tracks from the February 13th and 14th shows would later be released on Dick's Picks Volume 4

Personnel
 Jerry Garcia – acoustic and lead guitar, vocals on "Dark Hollow", "I've Been All Around This World", "Wake Up Little Susie", and "Black Peter"; electric guitar and vocals on "Smokestack Lightning" (both versions), "Hard to Handle", "Good Lovin'", "Big Boss Man", and "Sitting on Top of the World"
 Mickey Hart – drums and percussion on "Smokestack Lightning" (both versions), "Hard to Handle", "Good Lovin'", "Big Boss Man", and "Sitting on Top of the World"
 Bill Kreutzmann – drums and percussion on "Smokestack Lightning" (both versions), "Hard to Handle", "Good Lovin'", "Big Boss Man", and "Sitting on Top of the World"
 Phil Lesh – bass guitar and vocals on "Smokestack Lightning" (both versions), "Hard to Handle", "Good Lovin'", "Big Boss Man", and "Sitting on Top of the World"
 Ron "Pigpen" McKernan – acoustic guitar and vocals on "Katie Mae"; organ, percussion, harmonica, and vocals on "Smokestack Lightning" (both versions), "Hard to Handle", "Good Lovin'", "Big Boss Man", and "Sitting on Top of the World"
 Bob Weir – acoustic rhythm guitar and vocals on "Dark Hollow", "I've Been All Around This World", "Wake Up Little Susie", and "Black Peter"; electric guitar and vocals on "Smokestack Lightning" (both versions), "Hard to Handle", "Good Lovin'", "Big Boss Man", and "Sitting on Top of the World"

Technical personnel
 James Austin – production (reissue)
 Joe Gastwirt – mastering consultancy (reissue)
 David Lemieux – production (reissue)
 Peter McQuaid – executive production for Grateful Dead Productions
 Owsley Stanley – production

Charts
Album – Billboard

Notes

References

1973 live albums
Albums produced by Owsley Stanley
Grateful Dead live albums
Live at the Fillmore East albums
Albums recorded at the Fillmore
Rhino Entertainment live albums
Warner Records live albums